The 2021–22 Miami RedHawks men's basketball team represented Miami University in the 2021–22 NCAA Division I men's basketball season. The RedHawks, led by fifth-year head coach Jack Owens, played their home games at Millett Hall in Oxford, Ohio as members of the Mid-American Conference. They finished the season 14–18, 8–12 in MAC play to finish in seventh place. They lost in the quarterfinals of the MAC tournament to Kent State. 

Following the season, the school parted ways with head coach Jack Owens. On April 1, 2022, the school named former Xavier head coach Travis Steele the team's new head coach.

Previous season
In a season limited due to the ongoing COVID-19 pandemic, the RedHawks finished the 2020–21 season 12–11, 9–8 in MAC play to finish in seventh place. In the MAC tournament, they were defeated by Buffalo in the quarterfinals.

Roster

Schedule and results

|-
!colspan=12 style=| Exhibition

|-
!colspan=12 style=| Non-conference regular season

|-
!colspan=12 style=| MAC regular season

|-
!colspan=9 style=| MAC tournament

Source

References

Miami RedHawks men's basketball seasons
Miami RedHawks
Miami RedHawks men's basketball
Miami RedHawks men's basketball